Quid Pro Quo is a 2008 American drama film, written and directed by Carlos Brooks, and starring Nick Stahl and Vera Farmiga. The film is about a semi-paralyzed radio reporter who investigates a story that uncovers an odd subculture leading to a disturbing self-realization. The film premiered at the 2008 Sundance Film Festival on January 20, 2008, and was released in the United States on June 13, 2008.

Plot
Isaac Knott is a successful radio talk show host on a New York City public radio outlet. He lost the use of his legs at the age of eight in an automobile accident that also claimed the lives of his parents. He is a wheelchair user.

One day, Isaac learns about a man who showed up at a local hospital and demanded to have his legs amputated. The man was part of a secret subculture of able-bodied people who want to be paraplegics. They use wheelchairs whenever possible, and they try to deaden their legs through artificial means. Isaac becomes fascinated by these strange people, and begins studying the phenomenon for a news piece on his radio show.

Through his research, Isaac meets Fiona, a sexy but mysterious blonde who collects and restores Chinese art. Fiona also owns a wheelchair she doesn't really need. Increasingly attracted to her, Isaac tries to learn all he can about her role in the fake-paraplegic underground. Fiona, however, does not give away her secrets for free. Soon, Isaac discovers that the exchange of information and trust goes deeper the longer they know one another.

Cast

Production
On his inspiration for the film, director Carlos Brooks commented: "I was interested in taking this story into the psychological realm, where no matter what our physical condition, we all have the same psychological potentials or limitations that we struggle with. Isaac puts on these shoes which allow him to walk again. That send him on a quest where, in the end, he discovers that he has really been investigating himself." Through doing online research, Brooks said he discovered "there were people out there for whom getting help would be the exact opposite of what I thought getting help would be", leading to the idea of the Wannabes in the film. Brooks said the story was driven by the question of "why 'help' for an able-bodied person would be to have a disability, whereas 'help' to people with disabilities might be to regain use of certain functions."

Principal photography for Quid Pro Quo took place on location in Upper Freehold, New Jersey, with additional road scenes shot in La Conner, Washington.

Reception
Review aggregator website Rotten Tomatoes gave Quid Pro Quo an approval rating of 60%, based on 35 reviews. The critical consensus reads, "Despite a stunning performance by Vera Farmiga, Quid Pro Quo never develops its effective parts into a convincing whole." On Metacritic, the film holds an average score of 55 out of 100, based on 13 reviews, indicating "mixed or average reviews".

Critics said the film did not go far enough into the question of why able-bodied people would want to be handicapped. Kirk Honeycutt of The Hollywood Reporter said "Brooks delves into a netherworld of fetishisms and handicap worship in his daring first feature, Quid Pro Quo. The trouble is the movie isn’t daring enough. Brooks tiptoes into territory Luis Buñuel would have frolicked in, but he does so without the master surrealist’s desire to outrage and confound his viewers."

Writing for Paste, Alissa Wilkinson reviewed the film positively, writing Brooks "channels the inherent shock value of his material into a thoughtful, measured meditation on the nature of healing, wholeness and desire. Stahl and Farmiga are finely and unnervingly subtle, leaving unsettledness about what just happened and what it all means. The film, intimately shot, sidesteps exploitative potential, and the finely tuned screenplay obscures its titular theme (colloquially translated 'tit for tat’) in multiple layers of narrative and a hit of noir."

Though critics were mixed on the film’s plot and ending, with some criticizing the twist ending in particular, multiple critics commended Farmiga’s performance as Fiona. Reyhan Harmanci of the San Francisco Chronicle wrote "the only real tension onscreen is her mercurial moods, as she vacillates between objectifying Knott…to irrational, hysterical anger", adding, "it’s a shame…that the script didn't call for her to go full-on Fatal Attraction [as] she could have pulled it off." Honeycutt wrote, "Her Fiona is strong and weak, erotic and enigmatic, provocative and pathetic." Leo Goldsmith of IndieWire opined, "Though the film hints at sensitive and psychologically complex subject matter, it seems far more interested in wrapping its story up in a pretty and clever way than delving into rich emotional territory." Honeycutt concluded, "This is a startling and promising debut film by Brooks. You just wish he would trust his bent for the surreal more than he does."

See also
 Body integrity identity disorder

References

External links
 
 
 
 
 
 Press kit for film

2008 films
2008 romantic drama films
American romantic drama films
Films scored by Mark Mothersbaugh
Films set in New York City
Films shot in New Jersey
Films shot in Washington (state)
2008 directorial debut films
2008 independent films
Magnolia Pictures films
Films about paraplegics or quadriplegics
2000s English-language films
2000s American films
Films about disability